Indas (also spelled Indus) is a village, with a police station, in the Indas CD block in the Bishnupur subdivision of the Bankura district  in the state of West Bengal, India.

Geography

Location

Area overview
The map alongside shows the Bishnupur subdivision of Bankura district. Physiographically, this area has fertile low lying alluvial plains. It is a predominantly rural area with 90.06% of the population living in rural areas and only 8.94% living in the urban areas. It was a part of the core area of Mallabhum.

Note: The map alongside presents some of the notable locations in the subdivision. All places marked in the map are linked in the larger full screen map.

Demographics
As per 2011 Census of India Indas had a total population of 2,479 of which 1,284 (52%) were males and 1,195 (48%) were females. Population below 6 years was 256. The total number of literates in Indas was 1,440 (64.78% of the population over 6 years).

Civic administration

Police station
Indas police station has jurisdiction over Indas  CD block. The area covered is 255.10 km2 with a population of 152,829.

CD block HQ
The headquarters of Indas CD block are located at Indas.

Transport
Indas railway station, 68.5 km from Bankura, is a station on the Bankura-Masagram line (formerly Bankura Damodar Railway) of South Eastern Railway. As of September 2016, DEMU services were available between Bankura and Mathnasibpur. Bankura -Masagram line ( formerly B.D.R) expanded from October 2017 to Masagram Junction.

Education
Indas Mahavidyalaya is a coeducational institution affiliated to the University of Bankura. It was established in 2006 and offers courses in arts and science. Now Indas Mahavidyalaya is affiliated to Bankura University from the year 2017-2018 educational year.

Indas High School is a Bengali medium boys school established in 1893. It is a higher secondary school (classes 6 to 12). It is a government school.

Indas Girls High School is a Bengali medium higher secondary school (classes 6 - 12) for girls, established in 1956. It is a government school. It has 9 class rooms, 19 teachers and 10 computers.

Culture
David J. McCutchion mentions the Radha Damodara temple of the Sarkar family as a navaratna temple with terracotta façade built in 1796.

Healthcare
Indas Rural Hospital, with 30 beds at Indas, is the major government medical facility in the Indas CD block. There are primary health centres at Akui (with 4 beds), Keneti (Santasram Indus) (with 10 beds) and Dighalgram (with 6 beds).

References

External links

Villages in Bankura district